Djursholms Ekeby is a railway station at Roslagsbanan in Sweden. It serves Ekeby in Djursholm in Danderyd Municipality and is 8.3 km from Stockholm East Station. 

The station was built at the same time as the railway, in 1885. Its original name was Djursholm, since it was situated close to Djursholm, but the name was changed to Danderyd in 1890, when the name Djursholm was transferred to the station which nowadays is called Djursholms Ösby. In 1915 the name was changed again, this time to Djursholms Danderyd, because Djursholm had become a town. The station was then renamed Djursholms Ekeby in 1935.

References

Railway stations in Stockholm County